London Motor Show, formerly the London Motorfair, is a motor show in England. It was held biannually at Earls Court Exhibition Centre, from 1977 to 1999. When the event won the support of the Society of Motor Manufacturers and Traders and P&O Events, in October 1993, the name changed from the London Motorfair to The London Motor Show.

The London Motor Show revived in May 2016, being held at Battersea Park, with Prince Michael of Kent as its patron. The event of 2017 also took place at Battersea Park, before it moved to ExCeL London from May 2018 and continued in 2019.

The event of May 2020 was cancelled, due to the ongoing pandemic, and rescheduled to take place from 16 to 18 July 2021, in Battersea Park.

2019
The fourth  London Motor Show took place at ExCeL London (for the second time since its revival) from 16 to 19 May 2019, once again it featured a zone entitled "Built in Britain", promoting engineering by the British, as well as a live drift experience hosted by Caterham Cars.

2018
The third of the “relaunched” London Motor Show took place at ExCeL London (for the first time since its revival) from 17 to 20 May 2018, within the Royal Wedding. It featured a zone entitled "Built in Britain", promoting British engineering with exhibitors like Aston Martin, Bentley and JCB.

2017
The second of the “relaunched” London Motor Show ran from 4–7 May 2017, again in Battersea Park, with forty exhibitors. There were four premiers in the United Kingdom

 Alpina B4 S
 David Brown Mini Remastered
 Kahn Vengeance Volante
 MG XS

2016
The relaunched London Motor Show ran from 5–8 May 2016 in Battersea Park, with forty exhibitors. There were two premiers in the United Kingdom, and the launch of the prototype hydrogen car, Riversimple.

 Infiniti Q60
 MG GS
 Noble M600 (facelift)

2003
Following the cancellation of the show of 2001, the show of 2003 was planned to be called the New London Motor Show, and was due to take place at Earls Court from June 19 to 29, but following the twelve month consultation process with the motor industry in Britain, the organisers decided to cancel the show in November 2002, due to lack of support.

2001
The show of 2001 was scheduled to run at Earls Court between 17 and 28 October, but was cancelled in July 2001, due to difficult trading conditions.

1999
The show ran from 20 to 31 October, and included Classic Car Day (26 October 26) and special Motorsport Days (27–28 October).

 AC Ace V8
 AC Aceca V8
 Alfa Romeo 156 Selespeed
 BMW 318Ci
 BMW 320d
 BMW Z8 "007 The World is Not Enough"
 BMW C1
 Caterham Seven Superlight R500
 Daewoo Mirae Concept
 Daihatsu Cuore Custom 
 Ford Fiesta Sport 
 Ford Racing Puma
 Rover 25
 Rover 45
 Mazda 626
 Nissan Navara Double Cab "Lifestyle"
 Land Rover Defender Heritage
 Lexus RX 300 Luxury Concept
 Lotus Elise Type 49
 Isuzu Trooper 3.0 CT Commercial
 Jeep Wrangler "Yellow" Limited Edition
 Honda Accord Type-V 
 Honda HR-V by Kelly Hoppen
 Hyundai Trajet
 Mitsubishi Lancer Evo VI Extreme
 Peugeot Boxer (facelift)
 Subaru Impreza P1 Prototype
 Toyota Land Cruiser Colorado (facelift)
 Toyota Picnic SE
 Toyota RAV4 "Giant"
 TVR Tuscan Speed 6
 Vauxhall Astra Coupe
 Vauxhall Astra 1.8 16v SRi
 Vauxhall Astravan Sportiv
 Vauxhall Brava Limited
 Vauxhall G90 Concept
 Vauxhall VX220 Concept
 Vauxhall Vectra Design Edition

1997
 AC Ace
 Aston Martin V8 Volante
 Cadillac Seville SLS and STS
 Daewoo Matiz
 Honda Civic Station Wagon
 Isuzu VehiCROSS
 Kia Credos
 London Taxi TX1
 Lotus Esprit Sport 350
 Nissan Skyline GT-R V-Spec
 Seat Ibiza Cupra Sport F2
 Spectre R45 Concept
 TVR Cerbera Speed 12

1995
 Alfa Romeo GTV
 Caterham 21
 Chrysler Neon
 Fiat Brava
 Ford Fiesta
 Lotus Elise
 MG F
 Nissan Almera
 Renault Megane
 Rover 200 (world premiere)
 Vauxhall Vectra
 Vauxhall Maxx (concept car)

1993
 Audi RS2
 Fiat Punto
 Lister Storm
 Honda Civic Coupe
 Marcos GT Le Mans
 Peugeot 106 XSi
 SEAT Ibiza (three door)
 Spectre R42
 TVR Cerbera Prototype
 Vauxhall Tigra Concept
 Volkswagen Golf Jim McRae's Rally Car
 Volkswagen Vento VR6 Ray Armes' Rally Car

1991
The 1991 Motor Show was larger than previous years, with the use of the new extension of Earls Court 2, opened by Princess Diana on 17 October for the Motorfair.

 Mitsubishi Space Wagon
 Peugeot 106
 Renault 19 Cabriolet
 SEAT Toledo
 Vauxhall Astra
 Vauxhall Frontera

1989
 Land Rover Discovery
 Rover 200
 Vauxhall Calibra

1987
 Citroën AX GT
 Ford Sierra RS500 Cosworth
 Lotus Esprit
 Jaguar XJR-8
 Peugeot 405 Mi16
 TVR ES
 Vauxhall Astra GTE

1985
SEAT Ibiza

1983
 Austin Metro Gala
 Austin Metro Vanden Plas
 Austin Mini Sprite
 Alfa Romeo Alfetta 83'
 Alfa Romeo Giulietta 83'
 Dutton Austin Mini Moke "Californian"
 Ford Granada 83'
 MG Maestro 1600
 Lotus Excel 83'
 Jaguar XJ-SC
 Jensen Interceptor Series 4 
 Peugeot 205 5-door
 Peugeot 205 GTI
 Peugeot 505 GTI
 Renault 11 TL
 Renault 11 TSE Electronic
 Renault Fuego Turbo
 Tickford Aston Martin Lagonda
 Tickford Capri Turbo

References

External links

Auto shows in the United Kingdom
1977 establishments in England
Recurring events established in 1977
Annual events in London